The Pacific Collegiate Hockey Association (PCHA) is a collegiate hockey conference within Division 2 of the ACHA. The PCHA has been in operation for more than 40 years and administers the PCHA Playoffs at the conclusion of each regular season. The winner of the PCHA Playoffs receives the coveted Adams Cup, named after Cary Adams who started the conference.

History 

The PCHA, originally named the Southern California Collegiate Hockey Association, began in 1972. The three charter schools were Cal State Northridge, UCLA and Caltech. 

In 2008 San Diego State became the first PCHA team to advance to the ACHA Division 3 National Championship Game but lost to California University (PA). In 2011 College of the Canyons became the first PCHA team to win the national championship by defeating Hope College 5–3.

The PCHA has competed in Division 2 of the ACHA since the 2016-17 season.

Members

Former members

Adams Cup Champions 
When the PCHA was split into two divisions the Division 1 champion was awarded the Adams Cup named after founder Cary Adams. The Division 2 champion was awarded the Warden Cup named after former president Doc Warden. In the modern era the PCHA champion is awarded the Adams Cup.

Division 1 Championship Totals

ACHA Division 3 Nationals Teams 
From 2002-2012 the PCHA sent 17 teams to the ACHA Division 3 National Tournament.

2012 Host City: Vineland, NJ

College of the Canyons (Finished 7th)

Davenport (L 8-2)

Robert Morris (W 9-6)

Central Florida (W 7-6 OT)

Cal State Northridge (Finished 9th)

Hope College (T 5-5)

California (PA) (L 8-6)

Alabama (W 7-6 OT)

2011 Host City: Holland, MI

College of the Canyons (National Champion)

Fredonia State (W 4-3)

Loyola-Maryland (W 5-4)

Saginaw Valley State (W 4-1)

California (PA) (W 2-1 OT)

National Championship Game- Hope College (W 5-3)

2010 Host City: Fort Myers, FL

College of the Canyons (Finished 5th)

Florida (W 8-3)

Robert Morris (W 7-4)

Saginaw Valley State (L 4-1)

Cal State Northridge (Finished 11th)

Central Florida (L 7-4)

California (PA) (L 9-2)

Lansing Community College (W 8-6)

2009 Host City: Rochester, NY

Northern Arizona (Finished 6th)

Penn State-Brandywine (W 5-1)

Saginaw Valley State (L 7-2)

College of the Canyons (W 11-3)

Dordt College (L 2-1 SO)

College of the Canyons (Finished 14th)

Albany (W 6-5)

Grand Valley State (L 7-2)

Northern Arizona (L 11-3)

Georgia Tech (L 9-7)

2008 Host City: Rochester, MN

San Diego State (National Runner-Up)

Tennessee (W 5-3)

Hope College (W 6-1)

Central Florida (W 6-1)

National Championship Game- California (PA) (L 7-3)

Northern Arizona (Finished 6th)

Northwood (W 4-3)

California (PA) (L 7-3)

Farmingdale State (W 5-4)

Hope College (L 4-3)

2007 Host City: Fort Wayne, IN

Northern Arizona (Finished  8th)

Tennessee (W 9-5)

Albany (L 3-2)

Northern Colorado (L 8-3)

Indiana (PA) (L 3-2)

College of the Canyons (Finished 10th)

Kennesaw State (L 12-3)

California (PA) (W 11-5)

San Diego State (W 6-5)

Wright State (L 12-4)

San Diego State (Finished 12th)

Indiana (PA) (L 6-4)

Central Florida (W 3-2)

College of the Canyons (L 6-5)

Penn State-Berks (L 3-1)

2006 Host City: Fort Myers, FL

College of the Canyons (Finished 12th)

Wright State (L 6-1)

Indiana (PA) (W 5-4 SO)

Central Florida (L 12-1)

Pittsburgh-Johnstown (L 9-2)

2005 Host School: California (PA)

Fresno State (Finished 6th)

St. Vincent (W 9-4)

Penn State-Berks (L 7-3)

California (PA) (W 7-2)

Wright State (L 8-2)

2004 Host School: Arizona State

West Los Angeles College (Finished 9th)

Indiana (PA) (L 1-0)

Florida Gulf Coast (W 9-4)

Radford (W 16-1)

Georgia Tech (W 9-2)

2003 Host School: Muskegon Community College

College of the Canyons (Finished 5th)

Wagner College (W 3-2)

Hope College (L 1-0)

Tennessee (W 9-7)

Georgetown (W 5-4)

2002 Host School: Georgia Tech

UC San Diego (Finished 8th)

Georgia (W 4-3)

Muskegon Community College (L 5-3)

Slippery Rock (L 3-2)

References 

ACHA Division 2 conferences